Pennsylvania is a suburb situated on the high ground to the north of the city of Exeter in the county of Devon, England. It lies between the ancient deer park of Duryard and Stoke Hill. It was named after the US state by Joseph Sparkes, a Quaker banker who built the first terrace, Pennsylvania Park, in about 1821.

Its southern slopes, nearest to the city, include many spacious late Victorian and Edwardian houses, while on the steep higher hills, heading north out of Exeter, the housing is mainly 1920s–1970s, with a few newer estates on the city's extremities.

Its proximity within walking distance of Exeter University has made it popular with academics and students. J. K. Rowling was a resident of Pennsylvania while a student at Exeter University in the late 1980s.

See also
 Pennsylvania (disambiguation)

References

Areas of Exeter